The 2009 Family Circle Cup was a women's tennis event on the 2009 WTA Tour, which took place from April 13 to April 19. The event was hosted at the Family Circle Tennis Center, in Charleston, South Carolina, United States. It was the second and last event of the clay court season played on green clay. The total prize money offered at this tournament was US$1,000,000.

Entrants

Seeds

 Rankings as of April 13, 2009.

Other entrants 
The following players received wildcards into the main draw:

  Elena Dementieva
  Mallory Cecil
  Anastasia Pivovarova
  Alexandra Stevenson

The following players received entry from the qualifying draw:

  Shenay Perry
  Madison Brengle
  Angela Haynes
  Anastasija Sevastova
  Melanie Oudin
  Abigail Spears
  Marie-Ève Pelletier
  Lenka Wienerová

Finals

Singles 

 Sabine Lisicki defeated  Caroline Wozniacki, 6–2, 6–4
 It was Lisicki's first career title

Doubles 

 Bethanie Mattek-Sands /  Nadia Petrova defeated   Līga Dekmeijere  /   Patty Schnyder, 6–7(5–7), 6–2, [11–9]

External links 
 Official website
 ITF tournament edition details

Family Circle Cup
Charleston Open
Family Circle Cup
Family Circle Cup
Family Circle Cup